Perissoza is a genus of picture-winged flies in the family Ulidiidae.

Species
 P. scripta Enderlein, 1921

References

Ulidiidae